Senai Airport Highway or Jalan Lapangan Terbang Senai, Federal Route 16 is a major highway in Kulai District, Johor, Malaysia that connects Senai International Airport to Senai, which from there connected to Johor Bahru via Federal Route 1 Skudai Highway.

Route background
The Kilometre Zero of the Senai Airport Highway is located at Senai, Johor, at its interchange with the Skudai Highway (Federal Route 1), the main trunk road of the central of Peninsular Malaysia.

History
The highway was constructed in 1970. In 1973, the highway was opened to traffic while the Senai Airport began operations, as well.

Features
At most sections, the Federal Route 16 was built under the JKR U5 road standard, with a speed limit of 70 km/h.

List of interchanges

References

Kulai District
Malaysian Federal Roads
Expressways and highways in Johor